50 Cassiopeiae is a white star in the northern constellation of Cassiopeia. In the past, it had been misidentified as a suspected nebula, and given the number NGC 771. The star is visible to the naked eye, having an apparent visual magnitude of +3.95. It is moving closer, having a heliocentric radial velocity of −18 km/s, and will approach to within  in 1.879 million years.

It is an A-type main-sequence star with a stellar classification of A2 V. It is a suspected variable star with a very small amplitude. 50 Cas has an estimated 2.56 times the mass of the Sun, and about 2.5 times the Sun's radius. It is radiating 64 times the Sun's luminosity from its photosphere at an effective temperature of around 9,376 K.

The star was the brightest star in the occasionally used 1775 to 19th century constellation Custos Messium, typically drawn as a depiction of Charles Messier standing on top of the giraffe (Camelopardus), between Cepheus and Cassiopeia.

References

External links
 

A-type main-sequence stars
Suspected variables
Cassiopeia (constellation)
BD+71 0117
Cassiopeiae, 50
012216
009598
0580